The Couderay River is a tributary of the Chippewa River in northwestern Wisconsin in the United States.  Via the Chippewa River, it is part of the Mississippi River watershed. It flows for its entire length in Sawyer County. Its name is derived from the French "Rivière des Courte Oreilles" (River of the "Short Ears").

Course
The Couderay River flows from Lac Courte Oreilles and passes through Little Lac Courte Oreilles, the Billy Boy Flowage and the Grimh Flowage. It flows generally east-southeastwardly, through the Lac Courte Oreilles Indian Reservation and past the communities of Reserve, Couderay and Radisson.

See also
List of Wisconsin rivers

Notes

Rivers of Wisconsin
Rivers of Sawyer County, Wisconsin